A mandi, mashkhanna, or beth manda (beit manda, 'house of knowledge'; also bimanda) is a Mandaean building that serves as a community center and place of worship. A mandi is traditionally built on the banks of a yardna, or flowing river.

Although mandis are traditionally "cult-huts" made of straw, bamboo, and mud that are built by the river, nowadays mandis can also be modern buildings that serve as community houses and local administrative centers. A mandi typically holds weekly worship services, weddings, and many other important events and rituals.

In Iraq
A contemporary-style mandi is located in Nasiriyah, Iraq.

The town of Liṭlaṭa in Qal'at Saleh District, southern Iraq was also the site of a Mandaean mandi that the British scholar E. S. Drower often visited.

In Baghdad, the main mandi is called the Baghdad Sabian Mandi. It is located on the western banks of the Tigris River in the central Baghdad neighborhood of Al-Qadisiyah. In addition to Baghdad and Nasiriyah, mandis can also be found in Amarah, Kirkuk, Erbil, and Diwaniyah.

In Iran
The main mandi of the Mandaean community in Iran is located in Ahvaz. It is administered and maintained by the Mandaean Council of Ahvaz.

Outside Iraq and Iran
On 15 September 2018, the Beth Manda Yardna was consecrated in Dalby, Skåne County, Sweden.

In Australia, the Sabian Mandaean Association of Australia purchased land by the banks of the Nepean River at Wallacia, New South Wales in order to build a mandi. The current mandi in Liverpool, Sydney is Ganzibra Dakhil Mandi, named after Ganzibra Dakhil Edan. Another mandi exists in Prestons, New South Wales named Mandi Yehya Youhanna.

There is a mandi in Detroit, Michigan, USA that is run by the local Mandaean community.

In Nieuwegein, Utrecht, Netherlands, there is a mandi called Vereniging Mandi van de Mandeeërs Gemeenschap in Nederland (Mandi Association of the Mandaean Community in the Netherlands).

Essene parallels
The bit manda is described as biniana rab ḏ-srara ("the Great building of Truth") and bit tuslima ("house of Perfection") in Mandaean texts such as the Qolasta, Ginza Rabba, and the Mandaean Book of John. The only known literary parallels are in Essene texts from Qumran such as the Community Rule, which has similar phrases such as the "house of Perfection and Truth in Israel" (Community Rule 1QS VIII 9) and "house of Truth in Israel."

See also
Baptistery
Church
Mandir
Synagogue

References

External links

Album: The Ganzibra Dakhil Mandi, Liverpool, Sydney
Album: The Yahya Yuhana Mandi, Sydney
Performing masbuta inside a mandi in Ahvaz, Iran (video)
Interior of a mandi in Ahvaz, Iran (video)

Mandaean buildings
Mandaic words and phrases
Religious buildings and structures
Building types